José Leonardo Ocando (born April 18, 1987 or March 17, 1986) is a Venezuelan weightlifter. His personal best is 342 kg.

He won the silver medal at the 2007 Pan American Games in the 77 kg division with a combined lift of 337 kg, 13 kg behind the winner Iván Cambar of Cuba. He said of his performance and lifting 145 kg in the snatch; "My goal was to win a medal and I gave my best to do so. For me the snatch was the most difficult part, but, gladly, I got a good score."

At the 2008 Pan American Championships he won the gold medal in the 77 kg category, with a total of 342 kg.

He competed in Weightlifting at the 2008 Summer Olympics in the 77 kg division finishing seventeenth with 322 kg.

He is 5 ft 5 inches tall and weighs 172 lb.

References

External links
 NBC profile
 Athlete Biography OCANDO Jose Leonardo at beijing2008

1986 births
Venezuelan male weightlifters
Living people
Weightlifters at the 2007 Pan American Games
Weightlifters at the 2008 Summer Olympics
Weightlifters at the 2011 Pan American Games
Olympic weightlifters of Venezuela
Pan American Games silver medalists for Venezuela
Pan American Games medalists in weightlifting
South American Games silver medalists for Venezuela
South American Games medalists in weightlifting
Competitors at the 2010 South American Games
Medalists at the 2007 Pan American Games
20th-century Venezuelan people
21st-century Venezuelan people